Nicoleta Manu (née Țolișteanu, born  in Piatra Neamț) is a retired Romanian female volleyball player, who plays as a libero. She is part of the Romania women's national volleyball team and plays for Divizia A1 (Romanian's top league) side CS Știința Bacău.

Career
Manu has played in many tournaments with Romania women's national volleyball team, including the Women's European Volleyball Championship of 2003, 2005 and 2011, the 2002 FIVB Volleyball Women's World Championship in Germany and the 2015 European Games in Baku.

She was awarded the best receiver at the 2003 Women's European Volleyball Championship. She is nicknamed Țoli (in reference to her maiden name ) by her teammates.

Clubs
  CS Știința Bacău (1999–2012)
  Hainaut Volley (2012–2013)
  CSM București (2013–2013)
  CS Dinamo București (2013–2015)
  CS Știința Bacău (2015–present)

Honours and awards

Titles
 Romanian Championship – 2005

Individual awards
 2003 Women's European Volleyball Championship – Best receiver (libero)

References

External links
 Profile at CEV
 Profile  at Ligue Nationale de Volley (LNV)

1980 births
Living people
Romanian women's volleyball players
Sportspeople from Piatra Neamț
Volleyball players at the 2015 European Games
European Games competitors for Romania